Ischnura posita, the fragile forktail, is a species of damselfly in the genus Ischnura. It is 21 to 29 mm long. It is native to most all of eastern North America.

References

Ischnura
Odonata of North America
Insects described in 1861